Major General Soutchay Thammasith became the minister of security of Laos in 2002, replacing Asang Laoly.  Before becoming the security minister, he was the vice minister of the interior. He retired on February 17, 2005, citing health reasons.

External links
 Voice of America news article on the resignation

Year of birth missing (living people)
Living people
Members of the 6th Central Committee of the Lao People's Revolutionary Party
Lao People's Revolutionary Party politicians
Government ministers of Laos
Place of birth missing (living people)